The Passenger (French: Le passager) is a 1928 French silent film directed by Jacques de Baroncelli and starring Jean Mercanton, Charles Vanel and Michèle Verly.

Cast
 Jean Mercanton 
 Charles Vanel 
 Michèle Verly 
 Walter Byron 
 Nicolas Redelsperger 
 Abel Sovet

References

Bibliography
 John Holmstrom. The moving picture boy: an international encyclopaedia from 1895 to 1995. Michael Russell, 1996.

External links

1928 films
Films directed by Jacques de Baroncelli
French silent films
French black-and-white films
1920s French films